Not O.K. is a mixtape by Kool A.D., released December 21, 2013. The album is composed of tracks that did not make it on his forthcoming album, entitled Word O.K., and features guest appearances from Del the Funky Homosapien and Ladybug "Santos Vieira" Mecca of Digable Planets.

Reception
Not O.K. received mixed reviews from critics. Pitchfork criticized the album for presenting nothing new from Kool A.D., noting that Kool A.D. lacks "a sense of stakes in his music, a hint that he’s headed somewhere or challenging himself."

Track listing

References

External links
Not O.K. at Bandcamp

2013 mixtape albums
Kool A.D. albums